Morandé 80 is the street address for a door located on the east side of Palacio de La Moneda, the Chilean presidential palace. The door was built in 1906 so that the President of Chile  could enter the palace as a common citizen without receiving formal honours from palace guards.

History
Until 1958, the President actually lived in La Moneda, and frequently used the door to access the presidential residence. During the 1973 coup, President Salvador Allende's body was removed from the palace through Morandé 80, and the door was later sealed during renovations on La Moneda. After the return of democracy to Chile, Morandé 80 was used as a symbol by Allende's former supporters. 

On September 11, 2003, thirty years after the military coup, President Ricardo Lagos had the door rebuilt. It is opened only on special occasions.

Buildings and structures in Santiago
Individual doors
Palaces in Chile
Presidential residences
Tourist attractions in Santiago, Chile
1906 establishments in Chile